Tragus, commonly called bur gras, burr grass or carrot-seed grass, is a genus of plants in the grass family. It is native to Africa, Australia, and Eurasia with several species on islands in the Atlantic, Indian, and Pacific Oceans plus one species in Argentina.

Plants are monoecious, stoloniferous, and either annual or perennial depending on the species. The genus has been introduced in subtropical and tropical areas around the world as weeds of disturbed areas. The culms (stems) are ascending or low and mat forming, glabrous, and circular in cross-section. Blades are flat or folded and linear, ligules membraneous and trichomatous. Flowers are born in narrow panicles; the primary branches are spirally arranged, each possessing 2-5 spikelets; each of these spikelets bears a single floret. Each floret has 3 stamens, the anthers of which are pale yellow. The caryopses (grains) are elliptical and golden-brown.

Four species of Tragus have been introduced to North America: T. australianus, T. berteronianus, T. heptaneuron, and T. racemosus. The natural chromosome count is 2n = 20 in T. berteronianus, and 2n = 40 in T. racemosus. Tragus species utilize C4 photosynthesis. They prevent erosion, but make for poor grazing and in larger numbers indicate overgrazing.

 Species
 Tragus andicola -  Argentina (Catamarca, Jujuy, Salta, Tucuman) 
 Tragus australianus - Australia, New Caledonia
 Tragus berteronianus - Africa, Arabian Peninsula, Iran, Afghanistan, Pakistan, China; introduced in North America, West Indies, South America
 Tragus heptaneuron - Somalia, Kenya, Tanzania
 Tragus koelerioides - Zimbabwe, Namibia, Botswana, Lesotho, South Africa
 Tragus mongolorum - Mongolia, China, Indian Subcontinent, Indochina, Madagascar, Mauritius, Réunion
 Tragus pedunculatus - Namibia, Botswana
 Tragus racemosus - Africa + Eurasia from France and Canary Islands to South Africa to Kazakhstan

 formerly included
several species now regarded as better suited to other genera: Brachypodium Bromus Festuca Leptothrium Lolium Pseudechinolaena

References

External links
 Plants of Hawaii Gallery: Tragus berteronianus (Non-Native)
 Flora of America: Illustration of Tragus bertonianus and T. racemosus

Chloridoideae
Poaceae genera
Flora of Africa